Flemming Kristiansen (born 9 November 1940) is a Danish field hockey player. He competed in the men's tournament at the 1960 Summer Olympics.

References

External links
 

1940 births
Living people
Danish male field hockey players
Olympic field hockey players of Denmark
Field hockey players at the 1960 Summer Olympics
People from Kalundborg
Sportspeople from Region Zealand